The 1969 FIBA European Championship, commonly called FIBA EuroBasket 1969, was the sixteenth FIBA EuroBasket regional basketball championship, held by FIBA Europe.

First round

Group A – Caserta

Group B – Naples

Knockout stage

Places 9 – 12 in Naples

Places 5 – 8 in Naples

Places 1 – 4 in Naples

Finals – all games in Naples

Final standings

Awards

Team rosters
1. Soviet Union: Sergei Belov, Alexander Belov, Modestas Paulauskas, Gennadi Volnov, Priit Tomson, Anatoly Polivoda, Zurab Sakandelidze, Vladimir Andreev, Aleksander Kulkov, Aleksander Boloshev, Sergei Kovalenko, Vitali Zastukhov (Coach: Alexander Gomelsky)

2. Yugoslavia: Krešimir Ćosić, Ivo Daneu, Nikola Plećaš, Vinko Jelovac, Damir Šolman, Rato Tvrdić, Ljubodrag Simonović, Trajko Rajković, Dragutin Čermak, Dragan Kapičić, Vladimir Cvetković, Zoran Marojević (Coach: Ranko Žeravica)

3. Czechoslovakia: Jiří Zídek Sr., Vladimir Pistelak, Jiří Zedníček, Frantisek Konvicka, Jiri Ruzicka, Jiri Ammer, Jan Bobrovsky, Robert Mifka, Karel Baroch, Jiri Konopasek, Petr Novicky, Jan Blažek (Coach: Nikolaj Ordnung)

4. Poland: Bohdan Likszo, Edward Jurkiewicz, Bolesław Kwiatkowski, Włodzimierz Trams, Andrzej Seweryn, Grzegorz Korcz, Waldemar Kozak, Henryk Cegielski, Jan Dolczewski, Marek Ladniak, Adam Niemiec, Krzysztof Gula (Coach: Witold Zagórski)

References

External links
EuroBasket 1969 archive.fiba.com

1969
Euro
1969 in Italian sport
E
September 1969 sports events in Europe
October 1969 sports events in Europe
Sports competitions in Naples
20th century in Naples